Roland Edouard Gladu (May 10, 1911 – July 26, 1994) was a Canadian professional baseball third baseman. He played in 21 games for the Boston Braves of Major League Baseball (MLB) during the 1944 baseball season.

Biography
Gladu's baseball career began in 1932 at Binghamton, New York, and extended over more than 20 years as a player and manager in five countries: Canada, the United States, Mexico, Cuba, and England. Gladu played in London in the late 1930s for a team based at West Ham Stadium.

Gladu was one of 13 players suspended by Commissioner of Baseball Happy Chandler in May 1946 for jumping to the Mexican League, which offered higher salaries than the U.S. major leagues. Gladu had signed with Veracruz three months prior. Catcher Mickey Owen and pitchers Sal Maglie and Max Lanier were the best known of the other suspended players.

Gladu also played professional hockey in the off-season as a defenceman in the Quebec Hockey League. After his playing career, Gladu worked as a scout for the Milwaukee Braves. Pitcher Claude Raymond was one of the first players signed by Gladu.

Gladu died in 1994 in Montreal at age 83. He was inducted to the British Baseball Hall of Fame in 2011 and the Canadian Baseball Hall of Fame in 2021

Notes

References

External links

1911 births
1994 deaths
Baseball people from Quebec
Boston Braves players
Canadian expatriate baseball players in Mexico
Canadian expatriate baseball players in the United States
Canadian expatriate sportspeople in England
Hartford Laurels players
Major League Baseball third basemen
Major League Baseball players from Canada
Milwaukee Braves scouts
Minor league baseball managers
Montreal Royals players
Nuevo Laredo Tecolotes players
Philadelphia Phillies players
Quebec Athletics players
Richmond Colts players
Sherbrooke Athletics players
Baseball players from Montreal
Tuneros de San Luis Potosí players
York White Roses players
Canadian Baseball Hall of Fame inductees